"Never Scared" is a song by American hip hop recording artist Bone Crusher, released as his debut single and the lead single from his debut album, AttenCHUN!. The song was produced by Avery Johnson and features verses from fellow Atlanta-based rappers Killer Mike and T.I. The song became a Top 40 hit, reaching number 26 on the US Billboard Hot 100 chart, while also reaching the top 10 of the Billboard Hot R&B Hip-Hop and Rap charts. The success of the single propelled AttenCHUN! to reach number one on the Top R&B/Hip-Hop Albums, although Bone Crusher's success would be short-lived as "Never Scared" would be his only charting single. The song, however, was only the first of many future hit singles for T.I.

The official remix (dubbed "The Takeover Remix") features verses by New York-based rappers Cam'ron, Jadakiss and Busta Rhymes. The song was used by the Atlanta Braves as its theme song for the 2003 season. A Madden Remix to "Never Scared" is also featured on the video game Madden NFL 04.

In 2015 Bone Crusher reprises a version of the chorus from "Never Scared" for the song "All of Me" from WAOR (also ft. Josh Mckay)  
The song is featured on WAORs EP "Get Ready For WAOR" released October 1, 2016.

Chart history

Weekly charts

Year-end charts

References

Crunk songs
2003 debut singles
T.I. songs
Songs written by T.I.
Music videos directed by Bryan Barber
Bone Crusher (rapper) songs
2003 songs